César Tiempo, born  Israel Zeitlin (March 3, 1906 in Dnipropetrovsk (Yekaterinoslav), Russian Empire – October 24, 1980)  was a Russian Empire-born screenwriter of Argentine cinema. He wrote the script for award-winning films such as Safo, historia de una pasión  (1943). In 1961 he appeared as an actor in Esta tierra es mía.

References

External links
 

Male screenwriters
1906 births
1980 deaths
Film people from Dnipro
Emigrants from the Russian Empire to Argentina
Naturalized citizens of Argentina
Argentine Jews
20th-century Argentine screenwriters
20th-century Argentine male writers